The 90th Academy Awards ceremony, presented by the Academy of Motion Picture Arts and Sciences (AMPAS), honored the best films of 2017, and took place at the Dolby Theatre in Hollywood, Los Angeles, California. The ceremony was held on March 4, 2018, rather than its usual late-February date to avoid conflicting with the 2018 Winter Olympics. During the ceremony, AMPAS presented Academy Awards (commonly referred to as Oscars) in 24 categories. The ceremony, which was televised in the United States by ABC, was produced by Michael De Luca and Jennifer Todd and directed by Glenn Weiss. Comedian Jimmy Kimmel hosted for the second consecutive year.

In related events, the Academy held its 9th Annual Governors Awards ceremony at the Grand Ballroom of the Hollywood and Highland Center on November 11, 2017. On February 10, 2018, in a ceremony at the Beverly Wilshire Hotel in Beverly Hills, California, the Academy Scientific and Technical Awards were presented by host Patrick Stewart.

The Shape of Water won four awards, including Best Picture. Other winners included Dunkirk with three awards, Blade Runner 2049, Coco, Darkest Hour, and Three Billboards Outside Ebbing, Missouri with two awards, and Call Me by Your Name, Dear Basketball, A Fantastic Woman, Get Out, Heaven Is a Traffic Jam on the 405, I, Tonya, Icarus, Phantom Thread, and The Silent Child with one. The telecast garnered 26.5million viewers in the United States.

Winners and nominees

The nominees for the 90th Academy Awards were announced on January 23, 2018, at 5:22 a.m. PST (13:22 UTC), at the Samuel Goldwyn Theater in Beverly Hills, California, by actors Tiffany Haddish and Andy Serkis. The Shape of Water led all nominees with thirteen nominations; Dunkirk came in second with eight.

The winners were announced during the awards ceremony on March 4, 2018. Greta Gerwig became the fifth woman to be nominated for Best Director. At age 22, Best Actor nominee Timothée Chalamet was the third-youngest person nominated in that category and the youngest since 19-year-old Mickey Rooney for his role in Babes in Arms in 1939. At age 88, Best Supporting Actor nominee Christopher Plummer became the oldest ever performer nominated for a competitive Oscar. By virtue of her nominations for Best Supporting Actress and Best Original Song for Mudbound, Mary J. Blige was the first person to be nominated for both acting and songwriting in the same year. At age 89, Best Adapted Screenplay winner James Ivory became the oldest winner of a competitive Oscar. Jordan Peele was the first African American winner for Best Original Screenplay. Rachel Morrison became the first woman nominated for Best Cinematography.

Awards
Winners are listed first, highlighted in boldface, and indicated with a double dagger.

{| class=wikitable
|-
| style="vertical-align:top; width:50%;"|

The Shape of Water – Guillermo del Toro and J. Miles DaleCall Me by Your Name – Peter Spears, Luca Guadagnino, Émilie Georges and Marco Morabito
Darkest Hour – Tim Bevan, Eric Fellner, Lisa Bruce, Anthony McCarten and Douglas Urbanski
Dunkirk – Emma Thomas and Christopher Nolan
Get Out – Sean McKittrick, Jason Blum, Edward H. Hamm Jr. and Jordan Peele
Lady Bird – Scott Rudin, Eli Bush and Evelyn O'Neill
Phantom Thread – JoAnne Sellar, Paul Thomas Anderson, Megan Ellison and Daniel Lupi
The Post – Amy Pascal, Steven Spielberg and Kristie Macosko Krieger
Three Billboards Outside Ebbing, Missouri – Graham Broadbent, Pete Czernin and Martin McDonagh
| style="vertical-align:top; width:50%;"|Guillermo del Toro – The Shape of Water
Christopher Nolan – Dunkirk
Jordan Peele – Get Out
Greta Gerwig – Lady Bird
Paul Thomas Anderson – Phantom Thread
|-
| style="vertical-align:top; width:50%;"|

Gary Oldman – Darkest Hour as Winston Churchill
Timothée Chalamet – Call Me by Your Name as Elio Perlman
Daniel Day-Lewis – Phantom Thread as Reynolds Woodcock
Daniel Kaluuya – Get Out as Chris Washington
Denzel Washington – Roman J. Israel, Esq. as Roman J. Israel
| style="vertical-align:top; width:50%;"|

Frances McDormand – Three Billboards Outside Ebbing, Missouri as Mildred Hayes
Sally Hawkins – The Shape of Water as Elisa Esposito
Margot Robbie – I, Tonya as Tonya Harding
Saoirse Ronan – Lady Bird as Christine "Lady Bird" McPherson
Meryl Streep – The Post as Katharine Graham
|-
| style="vertical-align:top; width:50%;"|

Sam Rockwell – Three Billboards Outside Ebbing, Missouri as Officer Jason Dixon
Willem Dafoe – The Florida Project as Bobby Hicks
Woody Harrelson – Three Billboards Outside Ebbing, Missouri as Chief William "Bill" Willoughby
Richard Jenkins – The Shape of Water as Giles
Christopher Plummer – All the Money in the World as J. Paul Getty
| style="vertical-align:top; width:50%;"|

Allison Janney – I, Tonya as LaVona Golden
Mary J. Blige – Mudbound as Florence Jackson
Lesley Manville – Phantom Thread as Cyril Woodcock
Laurie Metcalf – Lady Bird as Marion McPherson
Octavia Spencer – The Shape of Water as Zelda Delilah Fuller
|-
| style="vertical-align:top; width:50%;"|

Get Out – Jordan Peele
The Big Sick – Emily V. Gordon and Kumail Nanjiani
Lady Bird – Greta Gerwig
The Shape of Water – Guillermo del Toro and Vanessa Taylor; Story by Guillermo del Toro
Three Billboards Outside Ebbing, Missouri – Martin McDonagh
| style="vertical-align:top; width:50%;"|

Call Me by Your Name – James Ivory; The Disaster Artist – Scott Neustadter and Michael H. Weber; 
Logan – Scott Frank, James Mangold and Michael Green; Story by James Mangold; 
Molly's Game – Aaron Sorkin; 
Mudbound – Virgil Williams and Dee Rees; 
|-
| style="vertical-align:top; width:50%;"|Coco – Lee Unkrich and Darla K. AndersonThe Boss Baby – Tom McGrath and Ramsey Ann Naito
The Breadwinner – Nora Twomey and Anthony Leo
Ferdinand – Carlos Saldanha and Lori Forte
Loving Vincent – Dorota Kobiela, Hugh Welchman and Ivan Mactaggart
| style="vertical-align:top; width:50%;"|A Fantastic Woman (Chile) in Spanish – Directed by Sebastián LelioThe Insult (Lebanon) in Arabic – Directed by Ziad Doueiri
Loveless (Russia) in Russian – Directed by Andrey Zvyagintsev
On Body and Soul (Hungary) in Hungarian – Directed by Ildikó Enyedi
The Square (Sweden) in Swedish – Directed by Ruben Östlund
|-
| style="vertical-align:top; width:50%;"|Icarus – Bryan Fogel and Dan CoganAbacus: Small Enough to Jail – Steve James, Mark Mitten and Julie Goldman
Faces Places – Agnès Varda, JR and Rosalie Varda
Last Men in Aleppo – Feras Fayyad, Kareem Abeed and Søren Steen Jespersen
Strong Island – Yance Ford and Joslyn Barnes
| style="vertical-align:top; width:50%;"|Heaven Is a Traffic Jam on the 405 – Frank StiefelEdith+Eddie – Laura Checkoway and Thomas Lee Wright
Heroin(e) – Elaine McMillion Sheldon and Kerrin Sheldon
Knife Skills – Thomas Lennon
Traffic Stop – Kate Davis and David Heilbroner
|-
| style="vertical-align:top; width:50%;"|The Silent Child – Chris Overton and Rachel ShentonDeKalb Elementary – Reed Van Dyk
The Eleven O'Clock – Derin Seale and Josh Lawson
My Nephew Emmett – Kevin Wilson Jr.
Watu Wote/All of Us – Katja Benrath and Tobias Rosen
| style="vertical-align:top; width:50%;"|Dear Basketball – Glen Keane and Kobe BryantGarden Party – Victor Caire and Gabriel Grapperon
Lou – Dave Mullins and Dana Murray
Negative Space – Max Porter and Ru Kuwahata
Revolting Rhymes – Jakob Schuh and Jan Lachauer
|-
| style="vertical-align:top; width:50%;"|The Shape of Water – Alexandre DesplatDunkirk – Hans Zimmer
Phantom Thread – Jonny Greenwood
Star Wars: The Last Jedi – John Williams
Three Billboards Outside Ebbing, Missouri – Carter Burwell
| style="vertical-align:top; width:50%;"|"Remember Me" from Coco – Music and Lyrics by Kristen Anderson-Lopez and Robert Lopez"Mighty River" from Mudbound – Music and Lyrics by Mary J. Blige, Raphael Saadiq and Taura Stinson
"Mystery of Love" from Call Me by Your Name – Music and Lyrics by Sufjan Stevens
"Stand Up for Something" from Marshall – Music by Diane Warren; Lyrics by Common and Diane Warren
"This Is Me" from The Greatest Showman – Music and Lyrics by Benj Pasek and Justin Paul
|-
| style="vertical-align:top; width:50%;"|Dunkirk – Richard King and Alex GibsonBaby Driver – Julian Slater
Blade Runner 2049 – Mark Mangini and Theo Green
The Shape of Water – Nathan Robitaille and Nelson Ferreira
Star Wars: The Last Jedi – Matthew Wood and Ren Klyce
| style="vertical-align:top; width:50%;"|Dunkirk – Gregg Landaker, Gary A. Rizzo and Mark WeingartenBaby Driver – Julian Slater, Tim Cavagin and Mary H. Ellis
Blade Runner 2049 – Ron Bartlett, Doug Hemphill and Mac Ruth
The Shape of Water – Christian Cooke, Brad Zoern and Glen Gauthier
Star Wars: The Last Jedi – David Parker, Michael Semanick, Ren Klyce and Stuart Wilson
|-
| style="vertical-align:top; width:50%;"|The Shape of Water – Production Design: Paul Denham Austerberry; Set Decoration: Shane Vieau and Jeff MelvinBeauty and the Beast – Production Design: Sarah Greenwood; Set Decoration: Katie Spencer
Blade Runner 2049 – Production Design: Dennis Gassner; Set Decoration: Alessandra Querzola
Darkest Hour – Production Design: Sarah Greenwood; Set Decoration: Katie Spencer
Dunkirk – Production Design: Nathan Crowley; Set Decoration: Gary Fettis
| style="vertical-align:top; width:50%;"|Blade Runner 2049 – Roger DeakinsDarkest Hour – Bruno Delbonnel
Dunkirk – Hoyte van Hoytema
Mudbound – Rachel Morrison
The Shape of Water – Dan Laustsen
|-
| style="vertical-align:top; width:50%;"|Darkest Hour – Kazuhiro Tsuji, David Malinowski and Lucy SibbickVictoria & Abdul – Daniel Phillips and Lou Sheppard
Wonder – Arjen Tuiten
| style="vertical-align:top; width:50%;"|Phantom Thread – Mark BridgesBeauty and the Beast – Jacqueline Durran
Darkest Hour – Jacqueline Durran
The Shape of Water – Luis Sequeira
Victoria & Abdul – Consolata Boyle
|-
| style="vertical-align:top; width:50%;"|Dunkirk – Lee SmithBaby Driver – Paul Machliss and Jonathan Amos
I, Tonya – Tatiana S. Riegel
The Shape of Water – Sidney Wolinsky
Three Billboards Outside Ebbing, Missouri – Jon Gregory
| style="vertical-align:top; width:50%;"|Blade Runner 2049'' – John Nelson, Gerd Nefzer, Paul Lambert and Richard R. HooverGuardians of the Galaxy Vol. 2 – Christopher Townsend, Guy Williams, Jonathan Fawkner and Dan SudickKong: Skull Island – Stephen Rosenbaum, Jeff White, Scott Benza and Mike MeinardusStar Wars: The Last Jedi – Ben Morris, Mike Mulholland, Neal Scanlan and Chris CorbouldWar for the Planet of the Apes – Joe Letteri, Daniel Barrett, Dan Lemmon and Joel Whist
|}

Governors Awards
The Academy held its 9th annual Governors Awards ceremony on November 11, 2017, during which the following awards were presented:

Academy Honorary Awards

 Agnès Varda  "Whose compassion and curiosity inform a uniquely personal cinema."
 Charles Burnett  "A resolutely independent and influential film pioneer who has chronicled the lives of black Americans with eloquence and insight."
 Donald Sutherland  "For a lifetime of indelible characters, rendered with unwavering truthfulness."
 Owen Roizman  "Whose expansive visual style and technical innovation have advanced the art of cinematography."

 Special Achievement Academy Award

 Alejandro G. Iñárritu  "For Carne y Arena virtual reality installation, in recognition of a visionary and powerful experience in storytelling."

Films with multiple nominations and awards

Presenters and performers
The following individuals, listed in order of appearance, presented awards or performed musical numbers.

Presenters

Performers

Ceremony information

Despite the mixed reception received by the preceding year's ceremony, the Academy rehired Michael De Luca and Jennifer Todd as producers for the second consecutive year. In May 2017, it was announced that Jimmy Kimmel would return as host for a second consecutive year. “Mike and Jennifer produced a beautiful show that was visually stunning. And Jimmy proved, from his opening monologue all the way through a finale we could never have imagined, that he is one our finest hosts in Oscar history,” said AMPAS president Cheryl Boone Isaacs in a press release announcing the return of the show's producers and hosts. Kimmel expressed that he was thrilled to be selected to emcee the gala again, commenting, "Hosting the Oscars was a highlight of my career and I am grateful to Cheryl [Boone Isaacs], Dawn [Hudson], and the Academy for asking me to return to work with two of my favorite people, Mike De Luca and Jennifer Todd. If you think we screwed up the ending this year, wait until you see what we have planned for the 90th anniversary show!" Kimmel became the first person to host consecutive ceremonies since Billy Crystal hosted the 69th and 70th ceremonies held in 1997 and 1998 respectively. In an allusion to the previous year's Best Picture announcement error, the official poster for the event featured the tagline "What could possibly go wrong?"

Several others participated in the production of the ceremony and related events. Harold Wheeler served as musical director for the ceremony. Production designer Derek McLane designed a new stage for the ceremony which prominently featured a curtain made of forty-five million Swarovski crystals. During the nominations announcement, several vignettes featuring Priyanka Chopra, Rosario Dawson, Gal Gadot, Salma Hayek, Michelle Rodriguez, Zoe Saldana, Molly Shannon, Rebel Wilson and Michelle Yeoh were shown before several categories highlighting the importance of below-the-line crafts in the film production. Four days prior to the ceremony, the Academy in conjunction with the Los Angeles Philharmonic hosted a special concert at the Walt Disney Concert Hall highlighting the Best Original Score nominees and the involvement of music in the film making process. During the performance of Best Original Song nominee "Stand Up for Something", ten individuals such as activist Dolores Huerta, Me Too movement founder Tarana Burke, chef and humanitarian José Andrés, and author Janet Mock appeared onstage to represent people who epitomized the message of the song. In view of the previous year's Best Picture announcement error, actors Warren Beatty and Faye Dunaway returned to present the award again.

Traditionally, the previous year's Best Actor winner usually presented the Best Actress award. However, Best Actor winner Casey Affleck reportedly decided not to attend the ceremony due to his sexual harassment accusations. Jodie Foster and Jennifer Lawrence presented the award together in his place. The Best Actor award was presented by actresses Jane Fonda and Helen Mirren.

Box office performance of Best Picture nominated films

At the time of the nominations announcement on January 23, 2018, the combined gross of the nine Best Picture nominees at the North American box offices was $568.2 million, with an average of $63.1 million per film. When the nominations were announced, Dunkirk was the highest-grossing film among the Best Picture nominees with $188 million in domestic box office receipts. Get Out was the second-highest-grossing film with $175.6 million, followed by The Post ($45.7 million), Darkest Hour ($41 million), Lady Bird ($39.1 million), Three Billboards Outside Ebbing, Missouri ($32.2 million), The Shape of Water ($30.4 million), Call Me by Your Name ($9.1 million), and Phantom Thread ($6.3 million).

Critical reviews
The show received a mixed reception from media publications. Some media outlets received the broadcast positively. Hank Stuever of The Washington Post remarked, "In his second year, Kimmel has shown that the telecast needn't be anything but sharp and sure, with a funny host whose bits are manageable, shareable and – best of all – forgotten. We're not making showbiz history here; we're just trying to get through another Oscar night." CNN's Brian Lowry quipped, "The Oscars are a big, unwieldy beast, which invariably try to serve too many masters. Yet if the intent was ultimately to maintain a celebratory tone without ignoring either the outside world or the elephant in the room throughout this year's awards, host Jimmy Kimmel and the show itself largely succeeded." Television critic Daniel Fienberg of The Hollywood Reporter wrote, "How did Kimmel do overall? With the exception of the theater stunt and two unnecessary toss-off Matt Damon jokes — Kimmel really can't resist — I thought he was good, probably even better than last year."

Others were more critical of the show. Television critic Maureen Ryan of Variety said, "All things considered, the show had a more or less low-key vibe. Normally it takes about two hours for the numbing effect to set in, but despite host Jimmy Kimmel's best efforts, Sunday's telecast started to feel a bit languid and low-energy far earlier." She also added, "The ceremony probably felt so ambiguous and conflicted in part because everyone in that room — and many at home — know how much more work needs to be done before true inclusion is the norm and all the offenders are driven from the industry." Time television columnist Daniel D'Addario commented, "Kimmel, a talk show host who has been inspiring and catalyzing in the past year while discussing issues personally connected to him, seemed flat and uninspired in his monologue when dealing with topics that demanded laceration." David Wiegand of the San Francisco Chronicle wrote, "Even the hope that the noise of clapping might keep the audience at home and in the theater awake, there was little of that for anything except the entrance of actors of advance age."

Ratings and reception
The American telecast on ABC drew in an average of 26.5 million people over its length, which was a 19% decrease from the previous year's ceremony. The show also earned lower Nielsen ratings compared to the previous ceremony with 14.9% of households watching the ceremony. In addition, it garnered a lower 18–49 demo rating with a 6.8 rating among viewers in that demographic. At the time, it earned the lowest viewership for an Academy Award telecast since figures were compiled beginning with the 46th ceremony in 1974. In July 2018, the ceremony presentation received eight nominations for the 70th Primetime Emmy Awards. Two months later, the ceremony won one of those nominations for Glenn Weiss's direction of the telecast.

"In Memoriam"
The annual "In Memoriam" segment was introduced by Jennifer Garner. Singer Eddie Vedder performed the Tom Petty song "Room at the Top" during the tribute.

 John G. Avildsen – Director
 Toni Ann Walker – Hairstylist
 June Foray – Actress, animator
 Walter Lassally – Cinematographer
 Chuck Berry – Singer-songwriter
 Robert Osborne – Columnist, television host, writer
 Jill Messick – Producer
 Harry Dean Stanton – Actor
 Terence Marsh – Production designer
 Rita Riggs – Costume designer
 Mary Goldberg – Casting director
 Anthony Harvey – Director, film editor
 Thérèse DePrez – Production designer
 Debra Chasnoff – Documentarian
 Jóhann Jóhannsson – Composer
 Jonathan Demme – Director
 Michael Ballhaus – Cinematographer
 Les Lazarowitz – Sound mixer
 Idrissa Ouédraogo – Director, writer
 Joe Hyams – Public Relations
 John Heard – Actor
 Martin Landau – Actor
 Glenne Headly – Actress
 Eric Zumbrunnen – Film editor
 Roger Moore – Actor
 Sam Shepard – Actor, writer
 Allison Shearmur – Executive, producer
 John Mollo – Costume designer
 Jeanne Moreau – Actress, director
 Loren Janes – Stuntman
 George A. Romero – Director, producer
 Rance Howard – Actor
 Sridevi – Actress
 Haruo Nakajima – Actor
 Martin Ransohoff – Producer
 Hiep Thi Le – Actress
 Ron Berkeley – Makeup artist
 Joseph Bologna – Actor, writer
 Fred J. Koenekamp – Cinematographer
 Murray Lerner – Documentarian
 Don Rickles – Actor, comedian
 Seijun Suzuki – Director
 Bernie Casey – Actor
 Shashi Kapoor – Actor, producer
 Tom Sanders – Production designer
 Danielle Darrieux – Actress
 Jerry Greenberg – Film editor
 Brad Grey – Executive producer, manager
 Míriam Colón – Actress
 Luis Bacalov – Composer
 Jerry Lewis – Actor, comedian, director, writer

See also
 75th Golden Globe Awards
 24th Screen Actors Guild Awards
 71st British Academy Film Awards
 38th Brit Awards
 60th Annual Grammy Awards
 42nd Laurence Olivier Awards
 72nd Tony Awards
 List of oldest and youngest Academy Award winners and nominees – Youngest nominees for Best Actor in a Leading Role
 List of submissions to the 90th Academy Awards for Best Foreign Language Film

References

External links

Official websites
 
 

News resources
 Oscars 2018 at The Guardian''

Analysis
 Academy Awards, USA: 2018 IMDb
 2017 Academy Awards winners and History at the Filmsite.org

Other resources
 

2018 awards in the United States
2017 film awards
2018 in American cinema
2018 in Los Angeles
Academy Awards ceremonies
March 2018 events in the United States
Television shows directed by Glenn Weiss
2018 television specials